Miss America 1951, the 24th Miss America pageant, was held at the Boardwalk Hall in Atlantic City, New Jersey on September 9, 1950. Based on the majority of Miss America's reign occurring during the year following her coronation, the pageant began referring to her title with the upcoming year. Thus, Yolande Betbeze, who was crowned in September 1950 would be called Miss America 1951. This continued until pageant activities moved from September to January in 2006. At that point, the queen would once again have the year of her title the same as the year in which she won. That change also marked the move away from its long-time base and point of origin, Atlantic City, to its new home in Las Vegas, Nevada.

Results

Awards

Preliminary awards

Other awards

Contestants

References

Secondary sources

External links
 Miss America official website

1951
1950 beauty pageants
1950 in the United States
1950 in New Jersey
September 1950 events in the United States
Events in Atlantic City, New Jersey